The Florida Catholic is the official newspaper for four of the seven dioceses in the Catholic Ecclesiastical Province of Miami. Based in Orlando, Florida, the newspaper publishes 24 issues a year in three dioceses; these editions include local, state, national and international Catholic news. The Miami Archdiocese edition is published once a month with local content.

Other articles discuss faith issues and highlight specific schools, ministries or parish activities. The Bishop of each Florida Diocese offers a personal message to subscribers in their diocese on current events or faith subjects. An online version of the newspaper offers the most recent edition as well as an archive of past articles and bishop's messages.

History
The paper was first published as a weekly in Miami in 1939. It moved to St. Augustine in 1942. It moved to Orlando about 1952. In 1958, it was replaced by The Voice, only in the Miami diocese, for the next 32 years.

In 1959, the paper moved to the Orlando suburb of Winter Park.

In 1972, the paper changed its format from broadsheet to tabloid.

In 1984, the Diocese of Pensacola-Tallahassee began publishing their own version of the newspaper.

In 1990, the paper absorbed The Voice published by the Archdiocese of Miami and began serving that area. The addition of Miami gives the paper a circulation of 140,000 and serving six out of the seven dioceses in the state.

In 1993, specific local sections were generated for each diocese.

In 2003, it was discovered that a bookkeeper had embezzled money totaling a large sum over decades. The bookkeeper was charged with grand theft and the editor felt obliged to resign. This resulted in an abbreviated publishing schedule for several years until losses could be recouped.

In 2004, the Catholic Press Association selected the paper to receive the Bishop John England Award for First Amendment rights, freedom of the press and/or freedom of religion.

In 2008, the paper is published for the final time in the St. Petersburg Diocese. It begins production of a new publication for that diocese, Gathered, Nourished, Sent.

In 2012, the paper added a digital e-Edition subscription ($20) which combines content from three dioceses (Orlando, Palm Beach and Venice) and began a social media presence on Facebook and Twitter.

Editors
Father Vincent Smith ?-1965
Father David Page 1965-1990
Henry Libersat 1990-1999
Steven Paradis 1999-2003
Christopher Gunty 2003-2008 
Denise O'Toole Kelly 2008-2009 
Mary St. Pierre 2009-2010

Footnotes

External links 
Florida Catholic Official Website
Florida Catholic historical issues freely available through the Florida Digital Newspaper Library

Catholic newspapers published in the United States
Roman Catholic Archdiocese of Miami
Roman Catholic Diocese of Orlando
Roman Catholic Diocese of Palm Beach
Roman Catholic Diocese of Pensacola–Tallahassee
Roman Catholic Diocese of Saint Petersburg
Roman Catholic Diocese of Venice in Florida
Roman Catholic Diocese of Saint Augustine
Orange County, Florida
Christianity in Orlando, Florida
Newspapers published in Florida
1939 establishments in Florida
Newspapers established in 1939